Tiah Toth ( Haynes, born 25 May 1993) is an Australian rules footballer who played for the Fremantle Football Club in the AFL Women's competition.

AFLW career
Of indigenous Australian heritage from her father's side, her introduction to the sport was through the Auskick program.

She was first drafted in 2014 at pick No.1 for the Western Bulldogs however just six days after her drafting she suffered a career threatening knee injury and was eventually delisted by the club. 

Toth was drafted by Fremantle with their fifth selection and thirty-sixth overall in the 2016 AFL Women's draft. She played the first three matches of the season before missing the remainder of the season due to a shoulder injury. She was delisted by Fremantle at the end of the 2018 season.

In the 2020 AFL Women's draft, Toth was re-drafted by Fremantle with their third selection after performing well for Subiaco in the WAFL Women's league. She returned to the AFLW side in the opening round of the 2021 AFL Women's season. It was announced she re-signed with the Dockers on 5 June 2021.

In April 2022, Toth was delisted by Fremantle.

Personal life
Her father, John Haynes, played 54 games for Perth in the WAFL.

Statistics
Statistics are correct to the end of the 2021 season.

|- style="background:#EAEAEA"
| scope="row" text-align:center | 2017
| 
| 6 || 3 || 0 || 0 || 13 || 6 || 19 || 2 || 5 || 0.0 || 0.0 || 4.3 || 2.0 || 6.3 || 0.7 || 1.7 || 0
|- 
| scope="row" text-align:center | 2018
| 
| 6 || 3 || 0 || 0 || 15 || 8 || 23 || 4 || 9 || 0.0 || 0.0 || 5.0 || 2.7 || 7.7 || 1.3 || 3.0 || 0
|- 
! scope="row" style="text-align:center" | 2019
|style="text-align:center;"| —
| — || 0 || — || — || — || — || — || — || — || — || — || — || — || — || — || — || —
|- 
! scope="row" style="text-align:center" | 2020
|style="text-align:center;"| —
| — || 0 || — || — || — || — || — || — || — || — || — || — || — || — || — || — || —
|- style="background:#EAEAEA"
| scope="row" text-align:center | 2021
| 
| 33 || 10 || 1 || 2 || 89 || 26 || 115 || 19 || 41 || 0.1 || 0.2 || 8.9 || 2.6 || 11.5 || 1.9 || 4.1 || 1
|- class="sortbottom"
! colspan=3 | Career
! 16
! 1
! 2
! 117
! 40
! 157
! 25
! 55
! 0.1
! 0.1
! 7.3
! 2.5
! 9.8
! 1.6
! 3.4
! 1
|}

References

External links 

1993 births
Living people
Fremantle Football Club (AFLW) players
Australian rules footballers from Western Australia
Indigenous Australian players of Australian rules football